Ulus is an underground station on the M1 line of the Ankara Metro in Altındağ, Ankara. The station is located beneath Istanbul Avenue at its intersection with Cumhuriyet Avenue. Ulus was opened on 29 December 1997 along with the M1 line. Ulus is located within the historic center of Ankara, with many historic government buildings in the vicinity.

Nearby Places of Interest
Ankara 19 Mayıs Stadium
Republic Museum - Second parliament building of Turkey.
Gençlik Park
Ulus Square

References

External links
EGO Ankara - Official website
Ankaray - Official website

Railway stations opened in 1997
Ankara metro stations
1997 establishments in Turkey